Luke Youlden (born 28 January 1978) is an Australian Supercars series racing driver. He is the son of two-time Australian Production Car champion Kent Youlden. Youlden currently drives for Kelly Grove Racing as a co-driver alongside David Reynolds in the No. 26 Ford Mustang GT. Outside racing, Youlden works at a performance driving school with fellow Supercars racer Dean Canto. He co-drove to victory with David Reynolds in the 2017 Supercheap Auto Bathurst 1000.

Racing career
Youlden's career started in the Victorian Formula Ford Championship in 1995 while he was completing Year 12. Due to a lack of funds, Youlden didn't progress to the national championship and remained in the Victorian series. At the same time, he joined Dugal McDougall Motorsport as an engineer and a driver. In 1999, Youlden was involved with Greg Ritter's Australian Formula Ford title win and with Ritter driving in the Bathurst 1000 that year, Youlden took his seat at the Bathurst support races. Youlden won both races and this, coupled with his victory in the Victorian series, allowed him to enter the national series in 2000. Youlden won the 2000 Australian Formula Ford Championship and also competed in the British Formula Ford Festival. He made his Bathurst debut the same year, driving for Perkins Motorsport alongside Christian Murchison. The pair were running inside the top five until a broken valve spring put them out of the race.

Youlden competed in the Australian GT Production Car Championship in 2001, winning Class E in a Holden Astra. He again competed for Perkins Motorsport in the V8 Supercar endurance races but was unable to secure a full-time drive for 2002. Youlden settled for what was then called the Konica Series, driving a Ford Falcon (AU) for Steven Ellery Racing, and would drive with Steven Ellery in the Queensland 500 and Bathurst 1000. Youlden and Ellery finished ninth at Bathurst and Youlden finished the Konica Series in 13th place after a bad start to the season hurt his championship chances. Youlden continued to drive for Steven Ellery Racing in both the Konica Series and the endurance races in 2003 and 2004. Youlden and Ellery finished on the podium in both endurance races in 2003 and the following year Youlden finished second in the Konica Series. Youlden was actually tied on points with series champion Andrew Jones but lost the title on a countback of round wins.

With Steven Ellery Racing dropping out the V8 Supercar Championship Series in 2005, Youlden was hired by Stone Brothers Racing to drive alongside Russell Ingall in that year's endurance races. The pair finished inside the top ten in both endurance races, helping Ingall to the 2005 title. Youlden remained with the team for 2006 and came perilously close to a second podium a Bathurst when he and Ingall finished in fourth place, just one one-hundredth of a second behind teammates James Courtney and Glenn Seton.

Youlden joined Ford Performance Racing for the 2008 endurance races, driving the team's second car with Dean Canto. The pair finished seventh at Bathurst and teamed together again in 2009, finishing ninth at the L&H 500 but failing to finish at Bathurst after Canto hit the wall at The Esses late in the race. 2010 saw the introduction of a rule stating that each team's regular drivers were not allowed to be paired together at the endurance races. This rule saw Youlden get paired up with Mark Winterbottom for the L&H 500 and the Bathurst 1000. Youlden and Winterbottom finished second at the L&H 500 and were on pole for Bathurst, however a delaminated tyre put Youlden into the wall in the middle of the race and this put them out of contention. Youlden was placed in the #6 car for 2011 alongside Will Davison and Youlden collected his first series pole position when the pair claimed the top grid spot at the L&H 500. After balance issues during the race, Youlden and Davison finished third behind the two Team Vodafone cars. Davison led the opening stint of the Bathurst 1000 but Youlden went off at Murray's Corner on the first safety car restart and hit the tyre wall. The pair recovered to finish on the lead lap, albeit in 18th place.

Youlden returned to Stone Brothers Racing in 2012 to partner Shane van Gisbergen. The pair scored pole position for the Sandown 500 before going on to finish fifth in the race. Van Gisbergen qualified the car in third for the Bathurst 1000 but the pair would only manage to finish the race in twelfth place. Youlden joined Brad Jones Racing for 2013 to drive alongside Fabian Coulthard in the new Endurance Cup. The duo finished in ninth place in the Endurance Cup standings, with a second-place finish in the second race of the Gold Coast 600.

In November 2021, Youlden would make his Supercars sprint debut when he was drafted by Kelly Grove Racing to drive the #26 Penrite Racing Mustang in place of David Reynolds. Reynolds was forced out of competition for Rounds 9-11 due to his COVID health exemption being overturned.

Career results

Supercars Championship results
(key) (Races in bold indicate pole position) (Races in italics indicate fastest lap)

Complete Bathurst 1000 results

Complete Bathurst 24 Hour results

References

External links
 Profile on Racing Reference
Profile at Driver DataBase

1978 births
Formula Ford drivers
Living people
Racing drivers from Melbourne
Supercars Championship drivers
V8SuperTourer drivers
Bathurst 1000 winners
Australian Endurance Championship drivers
Kelly Racing drivers
Dick Johnson Racing drivers
Team Penske drivers
Stone Brothers Racing drivers